The Açuã River is a river of Amazonas state in north-western Brazil, a tributary of the Mucuim River.

The river flows through the Mapinguari National Park, a  conservation unit created in 2008.
To the north of the national park it is crossed by the Trans-Amazonian Highway (BR-230), then runs through the Balata-Tufari National Forest, where it joins the Mucuim.

See also
List of rivers of Amazonas

References

Brazilian Ministry of Transport

Rivers of Amazonas (Brazilian state)